Joseph Cui Shouxun (27 July 1877 – 1953) was a Chinese Catholic priest and Bishop of the Roman Catholic Diocese of Yongnian between 1929 and 1953.

Biography
Cui was born Cui Buxian in the village of Xiaodian, Zhili, Qing Empire on July 27, 1877. His mother Cuilian Barui was a Catholic. He was ordained a priest on March 19, 1904. On June 11, 1933, he was appointed Bishop of the Roman Catholic Diocese of Yongnian by Pope Pius XI. He served until his death in 1953.

References

1877 births
1953 deaths
People from Hebei
20th-century Roman Catholic bishops in China